The Stadsbank van Lening is a not-for-profit city Bank van Lening dating from 1614 on the Oudezijds Voorburgwal in Amsterdam, Netherlands. It is the oldest credit distributor in Amsterdam and today has about 85 employees working here and in offices on the Albert Cuypstraat, Bijlmerplein and Osdorpplein.

History

The bank was built in 1614 as a conversion of an old warehouse used by the poorhouse O.Z. Huiszittenhuis that had been used to store peat for the inhabitants. In 1658 the poet Joost van den Vondel became a clerk there. He worked a total of 10 years for the bank and his "bank chair" has been kept.

Text above the doorway

Written by Balthazar Huydecoper in 1740:

References

 Stadsbank van Lening 1614 - 1989. W.D. Voorthuysen. Stadsdrukkerij Amsterdam, 1989

External links

 Website Stadsbank van Lening
 Stadsbank van Lening on website amsterdam.nl

17th century in Amsterdam
Banks based in Amsterdam
Pawn shops
Rijksmonuments in Amsterdam